Expedition to Hernando was a military movement of the Union Army during the American Civil War.

The Expedition
On August 16, 1863, the Union force set out on an expedition to Hernando Mississippi from Memphis Tennessee, With a skirmish with Confederate combatants near Panola Mississippi on August 17, 1863. The Union force had returned to Memphis Tennessee on August 20, 1863, to end the expedition.

Result
A minor skirmish

References

Expeditions of the American Civil War
1863 in Mississippi
Military operations of the American Civil War in Mississippi